Likewise may refer to:
 Likewise (company), American technology startup company
 Likewise (Frances Quinlan album), to be released in 2020
 Likewise (Stone House album), released in 2003
 Likewise Open, Active Directory software